Venezzia is a 2009 Venezuelan drama film based on real events; the role of Venezuela during World War II and a love story.

The movie stars famous telenovela actress Ruddy Rodríguez and Mexican actor and singer Alfonso Herrera along with another number of well-known Latin American actors.

Venezzia is, to date, the most expensive Venezuelan movie ever made.

Cast
Alfonso Herrera as Frank Moore
Ruddy Rodríguez as Venezzia
Rafael Romero as Commander Enrique Salvatierra
William Goite as Eduardo
Valentina Rendón as Graciela
Guillermo Garcia as Mayor Manny Diaz
Maleja Restrepo as Isabel Nuñez de Diaz
Santiago Cepeda as Carlomagno
Rita Bendeck as Tomasa
Alejandra Azcarate as Estefania
Felix Antequera as Nicolas

Plot
War and espionage sets the stage for a star-crossed romance in this historical drama from director Haik Gazarian. It's early 1942, and the United States has finally joined the Allied cause in World War II after the attack on Pearl Harbor. Oil is a precious commodity needed to fuel fighter planes, battleships, jeeps and other vehicles, and when German U-Boats are sighted off the coast of Venezuela on the Caribbean Sea, it becomes clear something must be done to guard the nation's oil fields from Nazi attack. Frank Moore (Alfonso Herrera) is an American communications expert sent to the coastal village of Puerto Miranda to help keep tabs on German plans to attack the oil fields. Moore was given the assignment in part because his mother was Latino and he speaks Spanish, but this doesn't help him get along with his commander, the authoritarian and short-tempered Capt. Enrique Salvatierra (Rafael Romero). However, when Moore meets Venezzia (Ruddy Rodriguez), Salvatierra's beautiful wife, he's immediately infatuated, and when she reveals that she shares his attraction, they fall into a love affair that could jeopardize their futures as well as Moore's mission, especially when he's suspected of being a double agent.

Awards

References

External links
 
 

2009 films
Venezuelan drama films
Films based on actual events
Films set in 1942
World War II films
War romance films